Hruso may refer to:
the Hruso people of Arunachal Pradesh;
the Hruso language, their language;
the Hruso languages, the family to which Hruso and Miri putatively belong.